Eric Whitney (born April 15, 1991), known professionally as Ghostemane or Eric Ghoste, is an American musician, singer, and songwriter. He has released eight solo albums and three collaborative albums under his Ghostemane moniker, primarily merging elements of heavy metal, hip hop and industrial music. Whitney has also released music with a number of additional solo projects, pursuing styles including black metal as Baader-Meinhof, noise music as GASM, and electronic music as Swearr. He began his career in local hardcore punk and doom metal bands around Florida. In 2015, he moved to Los Angeles, California, starting a career as a rapper, under the moniker Ill Bizz. Around this same time, he was a member of the hip hop collective Schemaposse.

Ghostemane's merging of trap and metal gained him popularity on SoundCloud. In 2018, Ghostemane released his seventh studio album, N/O/I/S/E, which was highly anticipated in the underground music scene due to its heavy influence from industrial and nu metal.

Early life
Eric Whitney was born on April 15, 1991 in Lake Worth, Florida to parents from New York. Whitney grew up in West Palm Beach, Florida. As a teenager, he was mainly interested in hardcore punk music. He learned to play the guitar and performed in several bands, including Nemesis and Seven Serpents. He also played football while he was in high school, saying he was practically forced to by his father, who died when Whitney was seventeen. At 21 he was told by his mother he had a biological father that the man he knew as his father had adopted him. He met his biological father Larry Dean Bowers and realized he had 28 siblings from Larry all the children had different mothers. He is closest to his younger sister Ashley Houck who also cameos on some of his music as Parv0 shes also known as DjMizz$uicide and has performed at the Gathering of the Juggalos festival and opened up for artists such as Bone Thugs-n-Harmony, Afroman, Tech N9ne, Insane Clown Posse, Kottonmouth Kings, Jelly Roll and others and has been featured on other tracks with artist such as Juicy J, and Rick Ross. His younger brother Horus is also apart of Whitney's band and has started his solo career. 

Whitney was introduced to rap music when he was the guitarist in the hardcore punk band Nemesis and a band mate introduced him to Memphis rap.

Career
Prior to his musical career, Whitney worked in several B2B sales positions. In 2015, Whitney moved to Los Angeles, California due to him not musically thriving in Southern Florida. He also gave up his employment. Meeting up with JGRXXN, Whitney joined his collective Schemaposse, which included artists such as Craig Xen and Lil Peep.

In April 2016, after just 1 year with the group, Whitney left Schemaposse. He subsequently released his self-produced album "Blackmage" and his first cinematic music video with his single "John Dee". Whitney eventually began to associate with fellow Florida rapper Pouya, who released the video for "1000 Rounds" with Ghostemane in April 2017. The video quickly went viral and as of May 2021, has over 29 million views.

In late 2017, Whitney saw greater success when art collective TRASH GANG created and released their 1930s cartoon edit music video for his song "Mercury: Retrograde". The cartoon was a 1933 Betty Boop short, Snow-White, featuring Cab Calloway as Koko singing St. James Infirmary. The video has since climbed to over 419 million views, making it his most well known single.

In October 2018 he teamed up with Zubin to release a track titled Broken.
Also in 2018, he released his seventh studio album, N/O/I/S/E, in which many of the songs are influenced by industrial metal, nu metal, Metallica, Marilyn Manson and Nine Inch Nails. In May 2020, he unveiled his latest project, a lo-fi black metal band called Baader-Meinhof, of which he is the sole member (credited as Eric Ghoste). Ghostemane is also the sole producer of his former fiancée Poppy's Christmas EP A Very Poppy Christmas released in December 2020.

In 2021, Ghostemane's music video "AI", directed by Nick Cinelli, was nominated for Most Bizarre at the Berlin Music Video Awards.

Artistry
Lyrically, Ghostemane's themes focus around occultism, depression, nihilism, death and illuminism. He started his career as a musician playing guitar in hardcore punk bands, and drums in doom metal bands. He has stated that his biggest influence is black metal band Bathory. He spent most of his teenage years listening to extreme metal bands such as Deicide, Death, Carcass and Mayhem. In terms of rap music, Ghostemane is influenced by Southern rap groups such as Outkast and Three 6 Mafia. He has also gone on to cite Midwest rap group Bone Thugs-n-Harmony as an early influence.

Backing band
Current
Parv0 – DJ
Nolan Nunes – bass 
Marcus Johnson – drums

Former
Mark Bronzino – guitar
Cayle Sain - drums

Discography

As Ghostemane

Studio albums
Oogabooga (2015)
For the Aspiring Occultist (2015)
Rituals (2016)
Blackmage (2016)
Plagues (2016)
Hexada (2017)
N / O / I / S / E (2018)
ANTI-ICON (2020)

Collaboration albums
Pallbearers || Tales from the Grave (w/DJ Killa C) (2015)
GRXXNGHOSTENAGROM (w/JGRXXN x Nedarb Nagrom)  (2015)
Elemental (w/Lil Peep x JGRXXN) (2016)
LXRDMAGE (w/Scarlxrd) (2021)

Compilations
Astral Kreepin (Resurrected Hitz) (2015)
Get To Know Us (w/Lil Peep x JGRXXN) (2016)
Hiadica (2019)

Extended plays
Ghoste Tales (2015)
Dogma (2015)
Kreep [Klassics Out Tha Attic] Featuring Dj Insane   (2015)
DÆMON (w/Nedarb Nagrom) (2016)
DÆMON II (w/Nedarb Nagrom) (2016)
DÆMON III (w/Nedarb Nagrom) (2017)
Dahlia I (w/Getter) (2018)
Fear Network (2019)
Opium (2019)
HUMAN ERR0R (w/Parv0) (2019)
Digital Demons (w/Nolife) (2019)
Lxrdmage (w/ Scarlxrd) (2021)
Fear Network II (2021)

Mixtapes
Blunts n' Brass Monkey (2014) 
Taboo (2014)
Singles

 Technicolor (2014)
 Kronol (2015)
 John Dee (2016)
 Hades (2017)
 Kybalion (2017)
 Tartarus (2017)
 Kali Yuga (2017)
 Nails (2017)
 Blood Oceans (How Many?) (w/ PHARAOH) (2018)
 D(R)Ead (2018)
 AI (2020)
 Lazaretto (2020)

As Ill Biz

Mixtapes
Revival (ft. Shepherd) (2012) (on tracks "Revival" and "Lean Wit It" only)
No Holds Barred (2012) (exclusive mixtape for datpiff.com)

versatyle (2013) (unreleased)               
[Soh] [fahy] mixtape (ft. Infinite SoFi) (2013)  (on track "Southside" only)
ILL BiZ EP (ft. Infinite SoFi) (2013)
1991 (2014)

As GASM

Studio albums
Www (2018)

As SWEARR

Extended plays
Technomancer (2019)

As Baader-Meinhof

Extended plays
EP (2016)
Evil Beneath a Veil of Justice (2019)
Baader-Meinhof (2020)

With Nemesis

Extended plays
From the Neighborhood (2012)

With Seven Serpents

Extended plays
Seven Serpents (2015)

As Eric Ghoste
 Music from the Motion Picture (2021)

References

External links

1991 births
Living people
21st-century American male musicians
21st-century American rappers
Alternative hip hop musicians
American black metal musicians
American hip hop singers
American industrial musicians
American male rappers
American noise musicians
Hardcore punk musicians
People from Lake Worth Beach, Florida
Rappers from Florida
Singer-songwriters from Florida
Trap metal musicians